The commandant of the Army War College is the senior United States Army officer commanding the United States Army War College. As a direct reporting unit of the United States Army, the commandant is responsible to the Secretary of the Army and Chief of Staff of the United States Army for the successful running of the Army War College. Since 1986, the commandant's official residence is Quarters 1 in Carlisle Barracks.

The position dates from 27 November 1901, when General Order 155 established a War College Board to advise the President of the United States and the direct the "intellectual exercise" of the Army. Major General Samuel B.M. Young was appointed president of the Board, thus making him the first President of the Army War College, despite the college only beginning operations under his successor, Brigadier General Tasker H. Bliss. The position was retitled as Commandant of the Army War College with the appointment of Major General James W. McAndrew to the presidency in 1919. Five commandants later became superintendent of the United States Military Academy.

The commandantship was vacant for two separate periods, both during wartime when classes were suspended: from August 1918 to June 1919 (during World War I) and from July 1940 to January 1950 (during World War II and the early postwar era).

The commandant, since 1986, has consistently held the rank of major general.

Commandants
List of commandants in chronological order

See also
Superintendent of the United States Military Academy
Superintendent of the United States Naval Academy
President of the Naval War College
Superintendent of the United States Air Force Academy
List of commandants of cadets of the United States Air Force Academy

Notes

References

United States Army organization
United States Army War College